Earth is an American experimental rock band based in Olympia, Washington, formed in 1989 and led by the guitarist Dylan Carlson. Earth's music is nearly all instrumental, and can be divided into two distinct stages. Their early work is characterized by distortion, droning, minimalism, and lengthy, repetitive song structures. Owing to their 1993 debut album Earth 2, Earth is recognized as a pioneer of drone metal. The band resurfaced in the early 2000s, with their later output reducing the distortion and incorporating elements of country, jazz rock, and folk.

Biography
Dylan Carlson founded the band in 1989 along with Slim Moon and Greg Babior, taking the title "Earth" from Black Sabbath's prior name. Carlson has remained the core of the band's line-up throughout its changes. 

Carlson was a close friend of Kurt Cobain, who sang lead vocals in the song "Divine and Bright", from a demo included on the re-release of the live album Sunn Amps and Smashed Guitars. Because police had twice confiscated guns from Cobain inside a single year, Cobain had Carlson purchase a shotgun for him on March 30, 1994. Cobain told Carlson the gun was for protection. Cobain would use the shotgun to kill himself six days later.

Earth 2 was described as a "milestone" by Terrorizers Dayal Patterson, which he described as "a three-track, 75 minute deluge of feedback and distorted guitars that marked the blueprint for what Carlson at the time coined 'ambient metal'". The band went on hiatus after the release of Pentastar: In the Style of Demons due to Carlson's personal problems, including heroin addiction, rehabilitation, his connection to Kurt Cobain's death, and incarceration. Carlson attributed the break primarily to his heroin addiction:

Earth reappeared around 2000 with a markedly different sound. Its music was still drone based, slow-paced, and lengthy, but it now included a drummer and featured strong elements of country music.  Remarking on the stylistic change, Carlson was quick to point to the continuity with Earth's previous sound:

The press release for Hex; Or Printing in the Infernal Method (2005) stated the band's music shows "the influence of country guitarists/songwriters such as: Duane Eddy, Merle Haggard, Roy Buchanan and fuses it with the vibe of epic visionary composer: Ennio Morricone." The press release for The Bees Made Honey in the Lion's Skull (2008) declares "Earth shows it's [sic] affinity with a nod to the best elements of the more adventurous San Francisco bands of the late 1960s and 1970s, and the more spiritually aware and exciting forms of Jazz-Rock from the same era". The press release for Angels of Darkness, Demons of Light I describes "inspiration from both British Folk-Rock bands the Pentangle and Fairport Convention".

Members

Current
 Dylan Carlson – guitar
 Adrienne Davies – drums

Former
 Slim Moon – vocals
 Greg Babior – guitar
 Joe Preston – bass guitar, percussion
 Ian Dickson – guitar, bass guitar
 Dave Harwell – bass guitar
 John Schuller – bass
 Sean McElligot – guitar
 Michael McDaniel – drums
 Jonas Haskins – baritone guitar
 Steve "Stebmo" Moore – electric piano, trombone, acoustic grand piano, Hammond organ, Wurlitzer electric piano
 Lori Goldston – cello
 Karl Blau – bass guitar
 Angelina Baldoz – bass guitar (tour only)
Don McGreevy – bass guitar
 Bill Herzog – bass guitar
 Brett Netson – guitar

Timeline

Discography

Studio albums
 Earth 2: Special Low-Frequency Version (1993)
 Phase 3: Thrones and Dominions (1995)
 Pentastar: In the Style of Demons (1996)
 Hex; Or Printing in the Infernal Method (2005)
 The Bees Made Honey in the Lion's Skull (2008)
 Angels of Darkness, Demons of Light I (2011)
 Angels of Darkness, Demons of Light II (2012)
 Primitive and Deadly (2014)
 Full upon Her Burning Lips (2019)

Collaborations
 The Bug & Earth: Concrete Desert (2017)

See also 
List of ambient music artists

References

External links

 

American experimental musical groups
American doom metal musical groups
Sub Pop artists
Blast First artists
Musical groups established in 1989
Heavy metal musical groups from Washington (state)
Southern Lord Records artists
Musical quartets
Drone metal musical groups
American post-rock groups
American experimental rock groups
Third Man Records artists